Kentlyn is a suburb of Sydney, in the state of New South Wales, Australia 58 kilometres south-west of the Sydney central business district, in the local government area of the City of Campbelltown. It is part of the Macarthur region.

History
Kentlyn was originally home to the Tharawal people who may have occupied the area for thousands of years. The area was largely uninhabited for the early 19th century until the 1890s when farmers started settling land. It became known as the Kent Farms and in 1933, it was formally dubbed Kent Lyn, which later modified to Kentlyn.

During the Great Depression of the 1930s, it became something of a shantytown for families who had lost their homes. Kentlyn Post Office was open from 1936 until 1938. These days it is considered one of the more upmarket parts of Campbelltown.

Heritage listings 
Kentlyn has a number of heritage-listed sites, including:
 Darling Avenue: Bull Cave

People
In the 2016 census, Kentlyn recorded a population of 740 people. 76.0% of people were born in Australia and 77.2% of people spoke only English at home. The most common responses for religion were Catholic 28.9%, Anglican 19.0% and No Religion 15.9%.

The median age of people in Kentlyn (State Suburbs) was 40 years. Children aged 0 – 14 years made up 19.7% of the population and people aged 65 years and over made up 22.9% of the population.

The median household weekly income was $2,050 compared to the national median of $1,438. All 207 homes in Kentlyn were detached houses, with no apartment blocks or townhouses in the suburb.

References

External links

  [CC-By-SA]

Suburbs of Sydney
City of Campbelltown (New South Wales)